Kohler SDMO is an industrial generator manufacturer which is a subsidiary of Kohler Company. It is based in Brest, specializing in the manufacturing of generating sets. SDMO is the leading manufacturer of generating sets in the European market (disputed, missing source) and is the 3rd largest worldwide (missing source), being present in over 180 countries through its dealers network.

Sites
SDMO has a total workforce of around 850 employees at all its sites, most of whom work in Brest, France and 70% of its sales are in the export market.

History
1966: Creation of SDMO in Brest by the Meunier Group, a large local industrial family, managed by Guy Coisnon. At the time, SDMO (Société de Distribution des Moteurs de l’Ouest) specialised in the manufacture of marine engines.
1969, SDMO Industries moves towards the manufacture of generating sets. It gradually phases out the production of marine engines to focus on the design and manufacture of generating sets.
From 1970 to 1985, SDMO sets up agencies nationwide, and signs its first contract in Africa.
1986, EDF Electricité de France introduces the EJP tariff. This step reduces the cost of electricity during peak demand, enabling SDMO to further establish its reputation in the French market and to significantly increase sales. It then widens its presence in Europe.
In the early 1990s, SDMO sets up branches in Spain and England and then Singapore.
1995, the company sets up a new plant and offices of 15,000 m² in Guipavas, near Brest.
2001: three subsidiaries are opened in Argentina, Brazil and the United-States and a representative office is set up in Algeria.
2003: a subsidiary is set up in Belgium
2005: a subsidiary is set up in Nigeria
2006: a representative office is set up in Dubai
2007: two new offices are set up in Johannesburg (South Africa) and Moscow (Russia).
2005, the Meunier family sells SDMO, as well as two other companies – SOREEL and BES – to the KOHLER Co. Group, an American family-owned multinational company, whose division Kohler Power System also designs and manufactures generating sets. Jean-Marie Soula is appointed as manager.
2006: KOHLER divides up the geographical marketing zones between SDMO and KPS to avoid any competition between the two brands. SDMO covers Europe, Africa, the Middle East and South America. KOHLER retains North America, Asia and Oceania.
2010: a subsidiary is set up in Germany and a 15,000 m² expansion of the existing production site in Guipavas is under construction, due to open at the end of 2011.
2013: the group acquired a new subsidiary in Brazil - former name Maquigeral
2016 : SDMO is being renamed KOHLER SDMO, a change of positioning and now a manufacturer of its own engines. It is unveiling its new KD Series range, over 700 kVA, with KOHLER engines.
The company's head office is moving into new premises in the immediate vicinity of its Kergaradec plant.

Business activity
The standard SDMO product range includes several different categories of generating sets, designed for a variety of target customers and applications:
 Low power generating sets, welding sets and motor pumps for the general public and professional builders.
 Standby generating sets for single dwellings and small multi-occupancy buildings.
 Standard configurable generating sets, medium to high power. They are used for continuous or standby power supply. They are mainly used for shopping centers, data centers, offshore platforms, telecommunications installations, etc.
 Generating sets for rental companies.

In addition to its standard product ranges, generating sets from 0.9 to 3,300 kW, SDMO provides services such as tailor-made genset design and mechanical or electrical training.

References
 L'Usine nouvelle (03 1994), Meunier monte en puissance
 L'Usine nouvelle (04 1994), Groupes électrogènes, le choix de la puissance
 L'Usine nouvelle (09 1994), Une usine taillée pour la conquête mondiale
 L'Usine nouvelle (05 1996), La couverture des créances à l'exportation
 L'Express (05 2002), Les 50 qui font bouger Brest
 L'Expansion (03 2003), L'Irak, terre de contrats français
 L'Usine nouvelle (04 2003), Les industriels se préparent à la guerre
 L'Expansion (07 2005), Les 5 descendants des grandes familles
 L'Usine nouvelle (01 2006), Le brestois SDMO sous pavillon américain
 L'Usine nouvelle (09 2006), SDMO va investir 10 millions d'euros à Brest
 L'Usine nouvelle (10 2006), SDMO se renforce à Brest pour croître à l'international
 L'Usine nouvelle (01 2008), SDMO confirme son extension sur Brest
 L'Expansion (09 2008), Les 15 patrons les plus influents
 L'Expansion (10 2008), Précision
 Le Télégramme (10 2009), Emploi : zoom sur le bassin brestois
 Classement 2009 de l'Expansion, Les 1000 premiers groupes industriels
 Palmarès 2009 de la COFACE et de l'API, Les 250 plus grands groupes de l'ouest
 L'Usine nouvelle (01 2010), SDMO s'agrandit à Brest
 Liebherr (10-2016), Co-Development by Kohler and Liebherr: New Kohler G-Drive Diesel Engine Range Delivers World-Class Power

External links
Kompass
CCI de Brest
SDMO Industries website
Kohler Co. corporate website
Kohler Power System website
SDMO Ukraine website

Brest, France
Manufacturing companies of France
Kohler Company
2005 mergers and acquisitions